The transverse cervical veins are veins that cross the neck.

References

Veins of the head and neck